Herbert James Molony (2 June 1865 – 22 July 1939) was a missionary of the Anglican Church.

Born in Dublin, Molony was educated at Leamington School and Pembroke College, Cambridge (whence he gained his Cambridge Master of Arts {MA Cantab}). He was ordained in 1888.  He was  a Curate at St Stephen's Newcastle upon Tyne then a CMS Missionary in Mandla.  From 1905 to 1907 he was Examining Chaplain to the Bishop of Nagpur when he became Bishop in Chekiang, a post he held for 20 years. Returning to England he was Rector of Teston until 1937.

He died on 22 July 1939; he had become a  Doctor of Divinity (DD).

References

1865 births
Alumni of Pembroke College, Cambridge
Anglican missionary bishops in China
1939 deaths
Christian clergy from Dublin (city)
20th-century Anglican bishops in China
Anglican bishops of Chekiang